The five pound gold coin is a British coin with a nominal value of five pounds sterling, produced in several periods since the early 19th century. Since 1990 it is also known as the five-sovereign piece or quintuple sovereign as it is equivalent to five sovereign coins and shares the alloy and design features of the sovereign.

Five-guinea coin
The five guinea gold coin started out life (in 1668) as coin worth 100 shillings (5 pounds) before the fluctuating value of the guinea eventually settled at twenty-one shillings (in 1717); therefore it is arguable that the five pounds piece issued after the Great Recoinage of 1816 is merely a continuation of this earlier coin. However, the £5 coin tends to have a more modern strike and so is normally considered separately.

George III five-pound coin
The first appearance of the denomination was in the reign of George III, when it was produced in 1820 as a pattern. The obverse shows the right-facing bust of the king with the legend GEORGIUS III D. G. BRITANNIAR. REX F.D. date, while the reverse shows Benedetto Pistrucci's now famous St. George and dragon design with no legend. The edge is inscribed on the normal version, but plain on the proof version.

George IV five-pound coin
The next appearance of the denomination was in the reign of George IV, when it was produced in 1826 and 1829. The obverse shows the left-facing bust of the king with the legend GEORGIUS IV DEI GRATIA date, while the reverse shows a crowned shield within a mantle cape with the legend BRITANNIARUM REX FID DEF. The 1826 coin has the edge inscription DECUS ET TUTAMEN ANNO REGNI SEPTIMO, while the 1829 coin has a plain edge.

Victoria five-pound coins

The next coin of this value did not appear until early in the reign of Queen Victoria, when one of the most famous and attractive of all British coins was produced, colloquially known as the Una and the Lion coin.  Una and the Lion are characters in Spenser's The Faerie Queene, this five pounds piece has acquired a cult significance among collectors: the obverse shows the young head of the Queen, facing left with the legend VICTORIA D G BRITANNIARUM REGINA F D, while the reverse shows Queen Victoria as Una leading the lion to the left, with the legend DIRIGE DEUS GRESSUS MEOS – May the Lord direct my steps (some coins say DIRIGIT instead of DIRIGE – The Lord directs my steps) – with the date MDCCCXXXIX (1839 AD) in the exergue under the lion. The edge may either have the inscription DECUS ET TUTAMEN ANNO REGNI TERTIO or be plain. This issue is the lightest of all the £5 coins, weighing only 38.7–39.3 grams.

The next appearance of the denomination was not until 1887, when the Jubilee head was used with the obverse inscription VICTORIA D G BRIT REG F D, while the reverse shows Pistrucci's design of Saint George slaying the dragon, with the only legend being the date in the exergue. The edge of this coin is milled, and it weighs 40 grams. This coin was also (rarely) produced in the mint at Sydney, Australia, which is identified by the letter "S" above the centre of the date.

The Pistrucci reverse was used again in 1893, when the obverse used the "Old Head" or "Veil Head" of the queen, with the legend VICTORIA DEI GRA BRITT REGINA FID DEF IND IMP, and the edge is again milled.

Early 20th-century five-pound coins
In the reigns of Kings Edward VII, George V, (Edward VIII), and George VI, five pound coins were only issued in proof sets in the first year of their reign (only prepared for approval in the case of Edward VIII, which is why his coin set the record as most expensive British coin in 2021 at $2,280,000). All these reigns used the Pistrucci George and Dragon obverse, with the 1902 and 1911 coins having milled edges, though at least some of the 1937 coins have plain edges. The 1902 Edward VII coin was also minted at Sydney, being identified by an "S" above the centre of the date.

Elizabeth II five-pound coin
The reign of Queen Elizabeth II saw a departure from the normal practice in issuing gold coinage. A small number of gold £5 pieces were struck in 1953 in order to provide continuity of the series, and again in 1957, but neither of these strikings were released to the public, with the result that they are now valued in the £250,000–£500,000 range.

No further £5 gold pieces were struck until 1980, nine years after decimalisation, since when they have been issued somewhat haphazardly in most years.

There are in modern times two different five pound gold coins simultaneously-minted, namely special gold editions of the £5 'crown', as well as what has become termed the "quintuple sovereign" or "five-sovereign piece" (being the equivalent of five sovereigns and part of the modern-day set of sovereign sizes). Both types are legal tender.

The £5 coins (quintuple sovereigns) are 36.02 mm in diameter in contrast to the commemorative 'crowns' that are 38.6mm diam.

Quintuple sovereigns
Gold £5 coins from 1980 to 1984 use the Arnold Machin effigy of the Queen, while the 1985–1990 coins use the Raphael Maklouf effigy. All these years use the Pistrucci reverse. In 1989 a completely new design was used to commemorate the 500th anniversary of the first issue of the original English sovereign coin – the obverse shows the Queen seated on the coronation throne holding the orb and sceptre, with the legend ELIZABETH II DEI GRA REG FID DEF, while the reverse shows a crowned shield within a double rose and the legend ANNIVERSARY OF THE GOLD SOVEREIGN 1489–1989.

Since 1990, these gold coins have continued to be produced in limited numbers in each year, chiefly as bullion coins but also of some collecting value, with some struck to proof or Brilliant Uncirculated standards, and with a nominal (ie no 'face') value in line with the other sizes of sovereigns. The Pistrucci reverse has also continued to be used, except 2002, when a special commemorative for the Golden Jubilee revived the shield reverse.

Modern-day crowns

Since 1990, £5 commemorative coins have been produced in cupronickel, but premium versions in silver and gold are often produced. These have been issued alongside new issues of the traditional Pistrucci-reverse five-pound gold coins, the 'quintuple sovereign'. These "modern five pound coins" are a continuation of the crown which was issued from 1544 as a five shilling coin.

These modern five-pound issues are not issued for circulation, but to mark events or commemorations of national or Royal significance.

References

British gold coins
Five-base-unit coins
Bullion coins